The 2008 ATP Tour was the global elite men's professional tennis circuit organised by the Association of Tennis Professionals (ATP) for the 2008 tennis season. The ATP Tour is the elite tour for professional tennis organized by the Association of Tennis Professionals. The ATP Tour includes the four Grand Slam tournaments, the Tennis Masters Cup, the ATP Masters Series, the International Series Gold and the International Series tournaments.

Schedule 
This is the complete schedule of events on the 2008 ATP Tour, with player progression documented until the quarter-final stage.

Key

January

February

March

April

May

June

July

August

September

October

November

Statistical information 
List of players and titles won (Grand Slam, Masters Cup and Olympic titles in bold), listed in order of number of titles won:
  Rafael Nadal – Monte-Carlo Masters, Barcelona, Hamburg Masters, French Open, London Queen's Club, Wimbledon, Canada Masters, and Beijing Olympics (8)
  Andy Murray – Doha, Marseille, Cincinnati Masters, Madrid Masters, and St. Petersburg (5)
  Novak Djokovic – Australian Open, Indian Wells Masters, Rome Masters and Tennis Masters Cup (4)
  Roger Federer – Estoril, Halle, US Open, and Basel (4)
  Juan Martín del Potro – Stuttgart, Kitzbühel, Los Angeles, and Washington, D.C. (4)
  Nikolay Davydenko – Miami Masters, Portschach and Warsaw (3)
  Andy Roddick – San Jose, Dubai and Beijing (3)
  Gilles Simon – Casablanca, Indianapolis and Bucharest (3)
  Nicolás Almagro – Costa do Sauipe and Acapulco (2)
  David Ferrer – Valencia and 's-Hertogenbosch (2)
  Fernando González – Viña del Mar and Munich (2)
  Michaël Llodra – Adelaide and Rotterdam (2)
  David Nalbandian – Buenos Aires and Stockholm (2)
  Jo-Wilfried Tsonga – Bangkok and Paris Masters (2)
  Dmitry Tursunov – Sydney and Metz (2)
  Tomáš Berdych- Tokyo (1)
  Marin Čilić – New Haven (1)
  Steve Darcis – Memphis (1)
  Marcel Granollers – Houston (1)
  Victor Hănescu – Gstaad (1)
  Ivo Karlović – Nottingham (1)
  Philipp Kohlschreiber – Auckland (1)
  Igor Kunitsyn – Moscow (1)
  Albert Montañés – Amersfoort (1)
  Kei Nishikori – Delray Beach (1)
  Philipp Petzschner – Vienna (1)
  Sam Querrey – Las Vegas (1)
  Tommy Robredo – Båstad (1)
  Fabrice Santoro – Newport (1)
  Robin Söderling – Lyon (1)
  Sergiy Stakhovsky – Zagreb (1)
  Fernando Verdasco – Umag (1)
  Mikhail Youzhny – Chennai (1)

The following players won their first title:
  Marin Čilić – New Haven
  Juan Martín del Potro – Stuttgart
  Marcel Granollers – Houston
  Victor Hănescu – Gstaad
  Igor Kunitsyn – Moscow
  Albert Montañés – Amersfoort
  Kei Nishikori – Delray Beach
  Philipp Petzschner – Vienna
  Sam Querrey – Las Vegas
  Sergiy Stakhovsky – Zagreb
  Jo-Wilfried Tsonga – Bangkok

Titles won by nation:
  Spain 16 (Costa do Sauipe, Acapulco, Valencia, Houston, Monte-Carlo Masters, Barcelona, Hamburg Masters, French Open, London, 's-Hertogenbosch, Wimbledon, Båstad, Amersfoort, Umag, Canada Masters, and Beijing Olympics)
  France 8 (Adelaide, Rotterdam, Casablanca, Newport, Indianapolis, Bucharest, Bangkok, and Paris Masters)
  Russia 7 (Sydney, Chennai, Miami Masters, Portschach, Warsaw, Metz and Moscow)
  Argentina 6 (Buenos Aires, Stuttgart, Kitzbühel, Los Angeles and Washington, D.C., and Stockholm)
  United Kingdom 5 (Doha, Marseille, Cincinnati Masters, Madrid Masters, and St. Petersburg)
  Serbia 4 (Australian Open, Indian Wells Masters, Rome Masters and Tennis Masters Cup)
  Switzerland 4 (Estoril, Halle, US Open, and Basel)
  4 (San Jose, Dubai, Las Vegas and Beijing)
  Chile 2 (Viña del Mar and Munich)
  Croatia 2 (Nottingham and New Haven)
  Germany 2 (Auckland and Vienna)
  Belgium 1 (Memphis)
  Czech Republic 1 (Tokyo)
  Japan 1 (Delray Beach)
  Romania 1 (Gstaad)
  Sweden 1 (Lyon)
  Ukraine 1 (Zagreb)

Entry rankings

Singles

Point distribution 

Points were awarded as follows:

Glossary
(€): All prize money and fees for ATP Masters Series, International Series, and Challengers played in Europe must be paid in euros (€). In most cases they are calculated at the US$0.85/EUR exchange rate, but it varies and is often rounded throughout the 2008 ATP Official Rulebook.

(^): Tennis Masters Cup: maximum number of points that can be assigned to the player at this round (after he qualified to the semifinal with 3 round-robin wins)

(m): Tennis Masters Cup: minimum number of points that can be assigned to the player at this round (after he qualified to the semifinal with 1 round-robin win)

+H: Any Challenger or Futures providing hospitality shall receive the points of the next higher prize money level in that category. Monies shown for Challengers and Futures are on-site prize amounts.

Points are assigned to the losers of the round indicated. Any player who reaches the second round by drawing a bye and then loses shall be considered to have lost in the first round and shall receive first round loser's points (5 for Grand Slams and all AMS events). Wild cards at Grand Slams and AMS events receive points only from the 2nd round. No points are awarded for a first round loss at International Series Events, Challenger Series, or Futures Series events.

Players qualifying for the Main Draw through the qualifying competition shall receive qualifying points in addition to any points earned, as per the following table, with the exception of Futures.

(*): 5 points only if the Main Draw is larger than 32 (International Series) or 64 (ATP Masters Series)

In addition to the points allocated above, points are allocated to losers at Grand Slam, Tennis Masters Series, and International Series Gold Tournaments qualifying events in the following manner:
Grand Slams: 8 points for a last round loser, 4 points for a second round loser
Tennis Masters Series: 8 points for a last round loser(**), 0 points for a first round loser
International Series Gold: 5 points for a last round loser(**), 0 points for a first round loser,

(**): 3 points only if the Main Draw is larger than 32 (International Series Gold) or 64 (ATP Masters Series).

Sources
The 2015 ATP Official Rulebook. ATP rankings 5. Point Table (Page 153)
ITF Tennis - Olympic Tennis Event - Ranking Points 
ATPtennis.com - Indesit ATP Ranking Points Breakdown 2007
stevegtennis.com - Entry System Tournament Points 2007

ATP race

Singles 
Grand Slams and Masters Series in bold. Points are shown in order of scoring. The second row shows the result and the week in which it was achieved. Italics indicate that a player is not yet eliminated from a tournament.

18 events count towards the race, split as follows:
 4 Grand Slam events
 9 Masters Series events
 5 other events

If a player has a valid forfeit or may not enter the Grand Slam or Masters Series, he may count the other events towards the race.

*

*

Masters Cup entrants 
The top eight players who qualify on the ATP Race (8 teams for doubles) will compete in the year-ending finale, in Shanghai, China, from November 9 through November 16. World no. 1 Rafael Nadal has withdrawn his name due to a foot injury.
 Masters Cup official website

As of October 5, the following entrants remain entered in the competition:

Doubles 
Unlike the ATP Singles Race, the Stanford ATP Doubles Race uses only the best fourteen tournaments on a team's ranking with no mandatory tournaments counting towards the ranking.

Points distribution (Singles & Doubles) 

(*) 1 point only if the Main Draw is larger than 32 (International Series) or 64 (Tennis Masters Series).

Prize money leaders 
As of 17 November 2008

Retirements 
Following is a list of notable players (winners of a main tour title, and/or part of the ATP rankings top 100 (singles) or top 50 (doubles) for at least one week) who announced their retirement from professional tennis, became inactive (after not playing for more than 52 weeks), or were permanently banned from playing, during the 2008 season:

  Hugo Armando (born on May 27, 1978, in Miami, United States) He turned professional in 1997 and reached no. 100 in singles the week of August 6, 2001, the only week he was within the top 100. His sole title and finals appearance came in doubles at the 2007 Delray Beach International Tennis Championships where he won with Xavier Malisse.
  Jonas Björkman (born 23 March 1972 in Alvesta, Sweden) He turned professional in 1991 and became world no. 4 in singles and world no. 1 in doubles. He won three Australian Open doubles titles, two French Open doubles titles, three Wimbledon doubles titles, and one US Open doubles title, in addition to being a doubles finalist in six Grand Slam tournaments. He also won two doubles year-end championships. He retired from professional tennis after competing at the 2008 Tennis Masters Cup Doubles championships.
  Gustavo Kuerten (born September 10, 1976, in Florianópolis, Brazil) He turned professional in 1995. He reached the world no. 1 ranking, won the French Open three times (1997, 2000, and 2001), and was the Tennis Masters Cup champion in 2000. He played his last match against Paul-Henri Mathieu at the French Open.
  Félix Mantilla (September 23, 1974, in Barcelona, Spain) He turned professional in 1993 and reached a career-high ranking of world no. 10. He reached the semifinals of the French Open and the quarterfinals of the Australian Open and earned 10 career titles. He played his last career match in July 2007 in Umag against Robin Haase.

See also 
 ATP Entry Ranking
 2008 in tennis
 2008 WTA Tour
 ATP International Series Gold
 ATP International Series
 Tennis statistics
 ATP rankings

References

External links 
 Association of Tennis Professionals (ATP) official website

 
ATP Tour
ATP Tour seasons